Udon Thani province is one of Thailand's seventy-six provinces (changwat) which lies in upper northeastern Thailand, also called Isan. It is bordered by the provinces of Nong Khai to the north, Sakon Nakhon to the east, Kalasin province to the southeast, Khon Kaen to the south, and Loei and Nong Bua Lamphu to the west. The provincial capital is Udon Thani, the major city in the province.

Toponymy
Udon Thani is said to mean 'northern city'. Udon is derived from utara in Sanskrit, meaning 'northern direction', as Udon Thani is northeast of Bangkok. Thani means 'city'.

History
Udon Thani first came to historical notice in the Rattanakosin era, when Anuwong of Vientiane staged a rebellion against Thai rule and marched his army to Nakhon Ratchasima in 1826. He captured the city by a ruse, but the garrison he left to hold it unexpectedly met with fierce resistance from the disarmed local forces led by Lady Mo, the wife of Nakhon Ratchasima's governor. Anuwong advanced as far as Saraburi, but was forced to retreat. The Thai army pursued him, and the rival forces met in battle at Nong Bua Lamphu, a small city near today's Udon Thani. After two days of fierce fighting, Anuwong's army was defeated and fled back to Laos.

Once known as Ban Mak-kaeng, Udon Thani was originally settled as a military base established by Prince Prachaksinlapakhom to suppress an uprising in the northeastern city of Lao Puan. Ban Mak-kaeng grew slowly from a small rural town to become what is now the city of Udon Thani. He founded Udon Thani town in 1893, established the civil administration and served important official duties for the region.

Udon Thani is one of the more bustling markets for agricultural goods in the relatively dry northeast of Thailand.

Udon Thani received its biggest economic boost in the 1960s when the United States built the Udorn Royal Thai Air Force Base as a joint-force military base during the Vietnam War. The Mel Gibson film Air America depicts Udon and includes scenes of Udon's air base. Udon Thani was also the largest base in the region for the CIA's anti-communism campaign in Thailand and Laos. The United States turned the base over to the Royal Thai Air Force in 1976, but its presence left three residual effects on Udon. First, a large number of locals had been paid comparatively well and had learned basic conversational English. This made them more marketable to the outside world, and a significant number went to work in Middle East oilfields. Second, the base created long-standing ties with the United States, including a US consulate in Udon (closed in 1995), and a US Veterans of Foreign Wars post. But most importantly, the base and the consulate made the city into a regional hub for the northeast, and this continues today.

In recent years Udon received international attention because of the discovery of large potash deposits. Some anticipate the region would become a major exporter of the mineral. However, granting the necessary approvals has been substantially delayed due to public opposition to mining. Many villagers living near the proposed mine site fear that the mining company's environmental impact assessment (EIA) did not adequately address the problems of salinization of the groundwater and soil, as well as probability of land subsidence. Either of these would seriously threaten the economic stability of local communities that depend on rice farming for income. An existing potash mine, Udon North mine has attracted local opposition.

Black site
The province has been named as the locale of a US CIA "black site" used to interrogate suspected terrorists by the United States. Suspected locations include Ramasun Station, dominated by a large wullenweber array, also known as the 7th Radio Research Field Station, in Tambon Non Sung of Mueang Udon Thani District; the 13th Artillery Battalion encampment (Camp Yutthasilpprasit) 13 km distant from Ramasun; Udorn Royal Thai Air Force Base; and a Voice of America (VOA) broadcasting station in Ban Dung District.

Geography

National parks
There are two national parks, along with five other national parks, make up region 10 (Udon Thani) of Thailand's protected areas.   
 Na Yung–Nam Som National Park, 
 Phu Hin Chom That–Phu Phra Bat National Park,

Administrative divisions

Provincial government

The province is divided into twenty districts (amphoe). Another five are now in Nong Bua Lamphu province. The districts are further subdivided into 155 sub-districts (tambon) and 1682 villages (muban):

Local government
As of 26 November 2019 there are: one Udon Thani Provincial Administrative Organization – PAO and 71 municipal (thesaban) areas in the province. The capital Udon Thani has city (thesaban nakhon) status. Further Ban Dung, Nam Kham-Nong Sung and Nong Samrong have town (thesaban mueang) status and 67 subdistrict  municipalities (thesaban tambon). The non-municipal areas are administered by 109 Subdistrict Administrative Organizations – SAO (ongkan borihan suan tambon).

Population and demographics 
Udon Thani's geographic position in the north of northeastern Thailand and its proximity to the Laotian capital, Vientiane, has contributed to the province's rapid development as a transport and industrial hub. This has created jobs and attracted migrants from other states as well as from overseas, particularly from Indonesia, the Philippines, Vietnam, Myanmar, Bangladesh, India, Pakistan, and China. In recent decades, the influx of illegal immigrants, particularly from Vietnam, has further swelled Udon Thani's population.

Udon Thani had a population of 1,548,107 as of 2010. The province's ethnic composition consists of Lao, Chinese, and other ethnic groups. The most populated cities in Udon Thani as of 2010  are:

Transportation 

Udon Thani is linked to the rest of Thailand by comprehensive air, road and rail connections. Most of the major highways that run through the northeastern Thailand, including Mittraphap Road, serve Udon Thani as well.

Air
Udon Thani International Airport, the province's primary airport, is in the district of Mueang Udon Thani near the border with Nong Khai province. Between them, several airlines operate over 160 flights per week (as of August 2017) to Bangkok.

Rail
Udon Thani railway station is the main railway station in Udon Thani.

Education 
Udon Thani has several tertiary education institutions, and is also home to an international school. Most of these academic centers are concentrated in major towns and cities in Udon Thani:

Public universities

Private universities and university colleges

International schools

Healthcare 
Notable hospitals in Udon Thani are listed below:

Human achievement index 2017

Since 2003, United Nations Development Programme (UNDP) in Thailand has tracked progress on human development at sub-national level using the Human achievement index (HAI), a composite index covering all the eight key areas of human development. National Economic and Social Development Board (NESDB) has taken over this task since 2017.

Media

Television 
Television in Udon Thani consists of thirteen free-to-air stations, one satellite television network, and two Internet television services. Seven of the thirteen free-to-air stations are broadcast from Laos (with four foreign relay stations). All of Thai stations are broadcast from Bangkok, except for NBT which has two hours of local programming.

Free-to-air
 MCOT
 Modernine TV
 TV3
 National Broadcasting Services of Thailand (NBT)
 NBT
 Royal Thai Army
 TV5
 TV7
 Public
 Thai PBS
 Lao National Television
 LNTV 1
 LNTV 3
 MV Lao
 Vietnam Television
 VTV3/VTV4
 China Central Television
 CCTV 4
 CCTV News

Satellite television
 TrueVisions

Internet television
 UDTV
 Nation Channel (Alternative News Network)

Radio 
Radio stations in Udon Thani are available on FM frequencies.

Commercial radio stations available in Udon Thani include Radio One (88.5), New Music (89.0), Cool FM (89.3), SR Radio (89.9), UFM (90.25), Kiss FM (90.75), NN Radio (91.75), Big FM (92.5), Udon FM (97.0), Nice FM (97.25), Live Hits (98.0), WOW FM (98.25), Sayamchai FM (98.5), OK Love (100.0), P Radio (104.4), Mittaphap FM (104.75), Isama Radio (105.25), Wansabai Radio (106.5), and Hit FM (107.0). Commercial radio stations are operated by a few media companies.

Local community radio stations include Rajabhat University Radio (107.7) operated by Udon Thani Rajabhat University (only available in Udon Thani and Phen), EFM (101.25), and Education Radio (96.0) which targets university students.

The seven government radio networks available are Modern Radio (91.5), NBT (93.75), Parliament FM (87.5), Post FM (99.0), Border Patrol FM (100.25), Police FM (105.75). The regions of Udon Thani that border other provinces can also receive two other MCOT radio stations; Khon Kaen FM (Udon Thani-Khon Kaen border) and Nong Khai FM (Udon Thani-Nong Khai border).

Radio stations from Laos available are LNR 1 (103.7), LNR 2 (97.3), and Vientiane City Radio (105.5).

Sister cities
  Lusaka, Zambia

Image gallery

References

External links 

 Official website

 
Provinces of Thailand
Isan